Daedeok District (Daedeok-gu) is a district in Daejeon, a metropolitan city in South Korea. Headquarters of KT&G, Korea Ginseng Corporation and Korea Water Resources, and Daejeon Logistics Terminal, Korea Express are located in this district.

External links
Daedeok-gu website